The Gallipolis City School District is a public school district based in Gallipolis, Ohio, United States.

The school district includes all of Clay, Gallipolis, Green townships, most of Raccoon Township as well as small portions of Addison, Springfield, and Perry townships in Gallia County.

Two incorporated villages are served by Gallipolis City Schools: Gallipolis and Rio Grande.

Schools
Gallia Academy High School 
Gallia Academy Middle School
Green Elementary School
Rio Grande Elementary School
Washington Elementary School
Clay Alternative School

See also
List of school districts in Ohio

References

External links

School districts in Ohio
Education in Gallia County, Ohio